Mayport is a small community located between Naval Station Mayport and the St. Johns River in Jacksonville, Florida. It is part of the Jacksonville Beaches communities. The only public road to Mayport is State Road A1A, which crosses the St. Johns River Ferry to Fort George Island. On June 3, 1909, through action of the state legislature, Mayport was incorporated as a city.

Climate

According to the Köppen Climate Classification system, Mayport has a humid subtropical climate, abbreviated "Cfa" on climate maps.

See also

 Neighborhoods of Jacksonville
 Naval Station Mayport

References

External links

 

Populated places in Duval County, Florida
Neighborhoods in Jacksonville, Florida
Former municipalities in Florida
Former census-designated places in Florida